Chaos Rising may refer to:

 Warhammer 40,000: Dawn of War II – Chaos Rising, real-time strategy video game
 Thrawn Ascendancy: Chaos Rising, the first in the Thrawn: Ascendancy trilogy